Francisco Javier Carrillo Soberón (born 10 August 1951) is a Mexican architect and politician affiliated with the Party of the Democratic Revolution. As of 2014 he served as Deputy of the LIX Legislature of the Mexican Congress representing the Federal District.

References

1951 births
Living people
Politicians from the State of Mexico
Mexican architects
Party of the Democratic Revolution politicians
21st-century Mexican politicians
Deputies of the LIX Legislature of Mexico
Members of the Chamber of Deputies (Mexico) for Mexico City